Said Mutabar (born 2 December 1997) is an Afghan cricketer. He made his first-class debut for Speen Ghar Region in the 2017–18 Ahmad Shah Abdali 4-day Tournament on 1 November 2017. He made his List A debut for Kabul Region in the 2018 Ghazi Amanullah Khan Regional One Day Tournament on 19 July 2018.

References

External links
 

1997 births
Living people
Afghan cricketers
Kabul Eagles cricketers
Spin Ghar Tigers cricketers
Place of birth missing (living people)